Ares (also sometimes Mars) is a character appearing in DC Comics publications and related media. Based on the eponymous Greek mythological figure, he is the Olympian god of war and major recurring adversary of the superhero Wonder Woman. He has been featured significantly as a persistent foe throughout every era of Wonder Woman's comic book adventures, and in many adaptations of her stories in other media. 

Ares first appeared in Wonder Woman #1, published in the summer of 1942, written by Wonder Woman creator William Moulton Marston. His introductory panels name him as Ares, though the narration goes on to note that he is "now called" by his Roman name Mars. He would be known by that name (with sporadic exceptions) for the next 45 years, until creative team George Pérez and Greg Potter restored the Greek name Ares as part of their reboot of the Wonder Woman comic book mythos in 1987.

As the narrative continuity of Wonder Woman comics has been adjusted by different writers and artists throughout the years, various versions of Mars/Ares (with various personalities and physical appearances) have been presented, though most have been depicted wearing Greek hoplite or Roman gladiator armor. The character's longest-running look, designed by George Pérez, is that of a red-eyed Greek warrior clad in black and indigo battle armor, face hidden by an Attic helmet. After DC's continuity was rebooted in 2011 (an event known as The New 52), the character cycled through several divergent visual interpretations (including one inspired by the physical appearance of then-writer of Wonder Woman, Brian Azzarello) before returning to his Pérez-inspired warrior design.

The character has appeared in various forms of media. He has been voiced in animated TV and film by actors Alfred Molina, Fred Tatasciore and Michael York, and portrayed on-screen in the DC Extended Universe by David Thewlis in the films Wonder Woman (2017) and   Zack Snyder's Justice League (2021).

Fictional character biography

Pre-Crisis

During most of the Golden Age, Silver Age, and Bronze Age of Comic Books, Ares was called Mars. His visual depiction remained faithful to Harry G. Peter's original design throughout the Golden and Silver Ages: a brawny, clean-shaven figure in Greco-Roman battle armor, a pair of entwined serpents emblazoned across the breastplate. In the character's first appearance, his armor was gold. Subsequent Golden Age appearances vary the armor's coloration, rendering it as bronze with green filigree, and later as pale violet with bronze filigree. Mars' Silver Age appearances maintained Peter's character design, but altered the color once again, this time to gray.

His debut appearance sees Mars seeking to realize his vision of eternal war and conflict in the world of man. He is chiefly opposed by Aphrodite, goddess of love, who seeks to realize a contrary vision of loving civilization. The men who worship Ares kill each other and their weaker brothers, selling women cheaper than cattle. When Ares taunts Aphrodite with his successful plans, Aphrodite creates a new race of women, the Amazons, from clay. They build a city-state called Amazonia, where they create a women-centered civilization for spreading the gospel of Aphrodite's Way. They are stronger than Ares's men. Hippolyta is granted a golden girdle that makes her invincible.

Mars eventually creates a home base on the planet of Mars and enslaves its superpowerful population to serve him and his chief deputies, the Duke of Deception, the Count of Conquest and the Earl of Greed. Mars' aide-de-camp is General Destruction. He uses Mars as an interplanetary headquarters, supplementing the enslaved Martian population with the spirits of the dead he collects from war zones on multiple planets, including Saturn and Earth. Slave spirits become embodied after being ferried to the planet Mars, where they are subjected to strength tests to determine their best use, whether as gladiators, personal slaves, or factory workers. The very strongest are trained and given new bodies to be sent to wage future wars on Earth. He also sets up the Injustice Court for humiliating slaves and meting out punishments. Mars' Earth base was beneath Mount Olympus and run by the Count of Conquest.

From this base, he seeks to defeat the Allied cause in World War II, sending thoughts of conquest, deception, and greed into the Axis leaders via astral projection, but he finds himself repeatedly thwarted by the Amazon champion Wonder Woman. When Wonder Woman rescues Steve Trevor from Mars, the War God orders his three lieutenants to capture her. The Earl of Greed is sent and enlisted German aid, along with convincing the Dean of Holiday College to rob it, but was imprisoned after failing. The Duke of Deception gains Japanese help and captures Wonder Woman, but she escapes before she leaves Earth, and he is imprisoned. The Count of Conquest gains Italian help and, by trickery, succeeds in shackling Wonder Woman and Steve Trevor and brings them to Mars. Greed and Deception are released while Wonder Woman is imprisoned in the dungeons. However, with the help of Etta Candy's spirit form, Wonder Woman escapes and overpowers Mars, whose Iron Palace is destroyed by his weapons, though he survives. The Duke of Deception tries many times to defeat Wonder Woman, but fails despite his cunning and incredible technology, and Mars finally strips him of his mighty appearance, showing him to be a weak, toothless man. The Duke of Deception, after being set with the female slaves, causes them to rebel and briefly rules Mars.

Mars repeatedly tangles with Wonder Woman on Earth-One and Earth-Two. During a period when Diana abandons her powers to live among the world of men, as the Amazons retreat temporarily to another dimension, Mars (calling himself Ares this time) and his children Phobos, Deimos, and Eris battle the Amazons to secure from Hippolyta the secret to domination of all dimensions of existence.  Later, he enlists his descendant Helen Alexandros to become the Silver Swan.

His final scheme before the history-changing battle of the Crisis on Infinite Earths is to ally himself with Hades and the Anti-Monitor to subdue the Gods of Olympus. As Wonder Woman engages him in final battle, Steve Trevor frees the gods, and Hades' wife Kore appeals to her husband with a message of love, leaving Mars isolated.

Post-Crisis
Despite being Zeus's son, Ares never fit in with the other gods of Olympus and creates his own realm, the Areopagus. Aphrodite, the patron of the Amazons, swears that her women will save the world with love from the hatred and warfare of Ares. Through his deceit and manipulations, Ares deposes Hades and becomes ruler of the underworld.

Ares attempts to destroy the Amazons, using Hercules against them, who sacks the island, but Diana is born and raised just in time to fight Ares as Steve Trevor's plane, driven by one of Ares's human puppets, crashes into Paradise Island. His plot is to instigate a nuclear war between the United States and Russia, but Diana traps him in her magic lasso and shows how this would lead to his own disappearance, with no one to worship him. Ares tasks her with "saving mankind from themselves", promising to return if she fails.

Although Ares abandons his plans, he possess an unimportant criminal Ari Buchanan and changes his name to "Ares Buchanan". He climbs the business ladder by providing high-tech weapons for gang wars. As Buchanan, he has a relationship with his lawyer, Donna Milton, who is Circe in disguise, although not even she knows it. Milton conceives a daughter, Lyta Milton, who possesses a great amount of magic. Ares did not care much about Donna, shooting her while she was pregnant. Circe, as Donna, later tries to help Diana out of a trap laid by Ares. She uses the last of her forces to shoot a gun that produces a sort of mini-black hole that absorbs Ares. Diana, the child, and she survive.

As opposed to ancient times, the roles of various gods are shown to have altered somewhat according to modern practices and beliefs. Accordingly, the faith-based power Ares's father Zeus receives proves to be very much diminished. Other gods such as Athena, Aphrodite, and Ares began to gain more power due to the appearance of the computer age, love never diminishing, and conflict remaining consistent. Thus, the three godly siblings eventually take over Olympus.

Realizing that conflict proves to maintain his strength over the output of war, Ares changes his title to the God of Conflict. To celebrate this change, he alters his appearance to a more approachable visage. His rule under this name proves to be short-lived, though, as Hades is overthrown and Ares is all too eager to take up the mantle of God of the Dead.

Family reunited
Realizing that a crossroads for the gods of Olympus is at hand, Ares confides in his half-sister Cassie Sandsmark about a future war. In exchange for additional powers, he asks only for her love. He travels to Themyscira and kidnaps his daughter Lyta, who is under the protection of the Amazons. Circe confronts Ares and is surprised to learn of his new godly title. She agrees to remain as his consort and to raise their daughter in the Underworld.

During Ares' family bonding with Cassie, he blesses her with a powerful lasso able to expel Zeus's lightning in times of anger. Ares appears to Cassie repeatedly to warn her about "the coming war". In one story, the Teen Titans are thrown 10 years into the future, where Cassie has inherited the mantle of Wonder Woman after Diana's death. She is also referred to as "Ares's champion".

Ares later appears to Cassie, informing her that the gods are leaving this plane and Zeus is taking the power he had granted Cassie. In exchange for acknowledging their siblinghood and becoming his champion, he offers her some of his power, saying only that she would be "more powerful than [she has] ever been". The full extent of Cassie's powers has not been revealed, though some indication exists that she has retained all of her former powers at this point.

During the events of Amazons Attack!, it is discovered that Ares left Circe and kidnapped their daughter to raise on his own. As Lyta and he were only spoken of during the storyline, their presence is yet unknown.

Cassie is confronted by Ares' son, Lord Lycus, whom Ares has sent to interfere with Cassie's powers.

Death
Shifting himself into the future, Ares steals the dead body of Wonder Woman and brings it back into the present. He manipulates several villains to use the body to create his bride and chief agent Genocide. He imbues this new creature with his own magical dominance, causing the new being's persona to be not only more deadly but completely obedient to him. Ares's plans to destroy the present-day Wonder Woman go awry when Diana destroys Genocide, leaving the monster's dead body to drown in the ocean. Angered, Ares commands a son of Poseidon to cause a swarm of deadly sea creatures to attack Themyscira and the new island nation of Thalarion. During this battle, Diana deduces that Ares is the grand manipulator and confronts him. Not allowing Ares much time to gloat in his latest masterpiece of war, Diana takes a battle axe and strikes Ares's head, splitting his helmet in two.

After death
Despite being gone from the mortal world, Ares is still manipulating events to destroy the Amazons. His next plot involves the birth of five male children by five random Amazons. Once they are born, he takes them under his wing before Ares is banished from Themyscira both in body and spirit by his father Zeus.

The New 52: Wonder Woman (2011–2016)

In The New 52 continuity, Ares is commonly referred to as War. His first appearance in this new continuity is in Wonder Woman (vol. 4) #4, where he is depicted as a bald, aged man with a white beard. Due to the revelation that Diana is the demigoddess daughter of Zeus, their new dynamic is that of half-brother and half-sister. War's calves and feet are permanently smeared with blood. He appears in a bar in Darfur, where his brother Apollo tries to convince him to side with him in his quest to take over the rein of Olympus.

He is revealed to be Diana's former mentor in Wonder Woman vol. 4 #0, a stand-alone issue published in September 2012 set in the past. He takes Diana under his tutelage because of her vast potential in combat, and teaches her the ways of the warrior. Their relationship is like a father-daughter relationship. However, they part ways when Diana is asked by Ares to slay the Minotaur, but is unable to bring herself to kill it. This show of mercy makes her a failure in Ares' eyes.

Over time, Diana learns she can trust Ares to protect their youngest brother, the infant Zeke, and his mother Zola. Alongside their British brother Lennox, Hera, and the New God Orion, they form a dysfunctional family unit that seeks to protect the baby from the First Born, their eldest brother, who had been imprisoned by Zeus eons ago. In Wonder Woman vol. 4 #23, Wonder Woman's group clashes with First Born in London, where Ares raises an army of soldiers and fights First Born himself after Wonder Woman is temporarily incapacitated. First Born overpowers Ares and prepares to kill him to usurp his position of God of War. Wonder Woman regretfully drives a spear through both of them, as it is the only way to stop First Born. In his last breath, Ares forgives and commends his former pupil, stating that she did what he would have done. Hades manifests to take Ares to his afterlife, and announces that Wonder Woman has taken on his position as God of War. Appearing to Wonder Woman in an apparition, counselling her on the ongoing conflict with the First Born, he tells her not to call him War anymore, as that is her name—she refers to him instead as Ares.

DC Rebirth: Wonder Woman (2016–present)
In the DC Rebirth reboot, Wonder Woman's origin is retold in the "Year One" storyline. A group of people called the "Sear" terrorizes a mall where Diana and her friends are exploring. They have been infected with the Maru virus, which causes them to lash out in homicidal rage, though Diana and Steve Trevor defeat them, and Barbara Ann Minerva discovers Sear is an anagram of Ares.

The god of war attacks shortly after this discovery. He reveals his desire to spread the virus across the world in major locations with the hope of turning most of the human population into warring killers to fuel his power. Diana offers him Themyscira's location in exchange for him sparing everyone, though Ares discovers she has no memory of its location; as a sacrifice of leaving the island, Diana was barred from returning by losing knowledge of how to return. Accepting her new role to save mankind, Diana, with the help of the patron gods in animal form, subdues Ares with the Lasso of Truth. Diana and her friends are given the locations where Ares has the virus sent and Diana is christened as Wonder Woman for her heroics.

Soon after, Ares' sons Phobos and Deimos conspire to free Ares from his imprisonment on Themyscira. They coerce Veronica Cale into aiding them by kidnapping the soul of her daughter, Isadore. Several years later, Cale and her associate Doctor Cyber still have no luck finding the island. Cale plots against Phobos and Deimos, and he recruits the sorceress Circe into trapping the twins into the bodies of two Doberman Pinschers.

Years later, the mysterious tree that had been growing on Themyscira is teleported to the false island that Wonder Woman had originally thought was her home. During a battle with the Cheetah, a drop of Wonder Woman's blood opens a portal to inside the tree. There, Wonder Woman and Veronica Cale encounter both Isadore Cale and an attractive, nude man who introduces himself as Ares. Diana had not faced Ares in Year One, but his sons in disguise. Themyscira serves as Ares' prison once he is calmed of his bloodlust with the love of Aphrodite, and Phobos and Deimos plot to gain access to kill their father and take his role, gaining his power. The gods alter Diana's memories to make her think she has returned to the island so she could never try to find the real Themyscira, thereby granting access to darker forces. Isadore becomes his ward in the meantime. He gives her the clue to how to defeat his sons: with love, not hatred. Once his sons have been defeated and bound by the Lasso of Truth, Ares reveals Isadore cannot leave without being split from her physical and astral forms. She can live with the Amazons, however, and thus have a life where she will not age.

Later, Darkseid's daughter Grail is imprisoned in the tree with Ares. Ares, inspired by the hope of justice, manipulates Grail into killing him with the Godkiller sword. This frees him of his imprisonment. Soon after, Wonder Woman encounters Ares, this time resembling the missing Steve Trevor, on a battlefield in Durkovia.

Powers and abilities
As do all Olympian gods, Ares possesses tremendous strength, though he is now perhaps the strongest of them, rivaled only by his half-brother Hercules. Moreover, he is a master of conflict and strategy with centuries of experience in the field, and has complete telekinetic command and mastery over any weapon or armor. He also possesses speed equal to that of Hermes once he absorbs massive amounts of the violent energies that give him his powers. Pertaining to his being a war god, violent actions and emotions such as anger, hate, death and bloodshed make him stronger and heal any wounds he may receive, as his soul is able to absorb the psychic energy created by such events. His armor is virtually indestructible and his weapons are greater than mortal ones. He can shapeshift into any form he wishes and can teleport himself and others. At one time, he was also recognized as the Death God of the Greek Pantheon, having control over the dead and able to resurrect and command a whole army of undead from the Underworld to do his will, and then send them back whenever he wished. Being a god, he is immortal and can only be harmed by magical weapons.

In The New 52 continuity, the character's mere presence invokes battle and slaughter in his surroundings. This is seen in Wonder Woman vol. 4 #4, where Ares is sitting in a bar in Darfur; all the men inside are dead and a riot is breaking out outside the bar – even children are taking part in the gunfire. In Wonder Woman vol. 4 #9, Ares is present at a café in Damascus, where a fatal blast takes place as he is leaving.

Other versions

Earth-One
In the Wonder Woman: Earth One continuity, the Armored Response Environment Suit called A.R.E.S. is featured in Volume Two as a U.S. military contingency plan for General Phil Darnell and Maxwell Lord. Ares himself is hinted at the end of the book as well. It is subsequently revealed that Maxwell Lord is actually Ares in disguise and seeks to eliminate the Amazons in retaliation for his daughter Hippolyta turning against him centuries ago. During the fight between the Amazons and their allies and his A.R.E.S. machines, Ares himself mentally links himself with one of the drones to battle his granddaughter Diana. However, Diana defeats him by using her lasso to compel the machine to self-destruct, which also causes him to "self-destruct" as well due to being linked with it.

Sensation Comics Featuring Wonder Woman
Ares appears in two different stories in this anthology series featuring Wonder Woman. In the first, "Casualties of War", Wonder Woman is attacked by a dragon that is later revealed to have been a pawn of Ares. In the second story, "Vendetta", Ares ambushes Wonder Woman in a small African city. He summons his Spartoi, reptilian soldiers, to aid in his battle, but he is inevitably defeated by Wonder Woman.

Dark Nights: Metal
In Dark Knights: The Merciless, part of a series looking at dark alternate versions of Batman who have the powers of other members of the Justice League, one Batman comes from a reality where Ares acquired a new helmet that enhanced his powers to induce conflict. After Wonder Woman and other members of the League had been apparently killed in battle with Ares, Batman donned Ares' discarded helmet to use it against him, only to succumb to the helmet's power to the point that he not only defeated Ares, but even killed Diana when it was revealed that she had survived the attack because he was already so far under the helmet's influence.

In other media

Television
 Ares appears in the Justice League Unlimited episode "Hawk and Dove", voiced by Michael York. He commissions Hephaestus to forge the Annihilator, a living suit of armor fueled by violence, so he can incite conflict between North and South Kasnia and destabilize the region. However, Justice Leaguers Wonder Woman and Hawk and Dove, intervene, forcing Ares to flee while the Leaguers confiscate the Annihilator.
 Ares makes a non-speaking appearance in the Harley Quinn episode "Bachelorette" as an exotic dancer on Hedonikka, an island near Themyscira.

Film
 Ares appears in Wonder Woman (2009), voiced by Alfred Molina. This version sports long platinum hair. In ancient times, he and his son Thrax waged war against Queen Hippolyta, though it resulted in Thrax's death while Ares had his powers restricted by mystical armbands placed by Hera before he was imprisoned in Themyscira. After seducing an Amazon named Persephone and convincing her to free him in the present, Ares visits Hades to remove his bands. Upon regaining his full strength, he intends to wage war on all of humanity and feed on the resulting chaos so he can challenge his fellow Olympians, but is opposed by Wonder Woman and the Amazons. Despite transforming into a giant, Wonder Woman eventually decapitates Ares, reuniting him with Thrax in the Underworld, where they are forced to serve Hades.
 Ares appears in films set in the DC Extended Universe, portrayed by David Thewlis.
 First appearing in Wonder Woman (2017), this version is the treacherous son of Zeus and half-brother of Diana Prince / Wonder Woman. In the past, Ares attempted to influence mankind towards destruction and slaughtered his fellow Olympians, but a dying Zeus cast him from Olympus, stranding him in the mortal world, and gave the Amazons the "god-killer" sword so they can slay Ares should he ever return. Despite what happened, Ares spent the intervening centuries orchestrating wars and conflicts to cause mankind's self-destruction. During World War I, he masquerades as Imperial War Cabinet speaker "Sir Patrick Morgan" to manipulate the Allies and the Central Powers into entering more conflicts. Upon learning of Ares' actions, Prince confronts Ares, who destroys the god-killer and attempts to persuade her to join him. However, she realizes love, not hate, is the only way to prevent conflict and eventually kills Ares.
 Ares appears in a flashback in Justice League, physically portrayed by uncredited stuntman Nick McKinless with Thewlis' face superimposed on top of his. He and the Olympians join forces with the Amazons, Atlanteans, mankind, and the active Green Lantern of Earth's sector to battle Steppenwolf's forces. In the director's cut, Ares defeats a young Darkseid.

Video games
 Ares appears in DC Universe Online.
 Ares appears as a playable character in Injustice: Gods Among Us, voiced by J. G. Hertzler. An alternate reality version assists the "prime" Aquaman and Wonder Woman in dismantling High Councilor Superman's Regime due to not having enough conflict to feed on, leaving him virtually powerless. In his non-canonical arcade mode ending, Ares defeats Superman, but his victory leads to world peace, draining his power further. Near death, he captures Brainiac 5 and forces him to create a time loop of the game's events so he can continuously feed off the unending cycle of conflict.
 Ares appears as a summonable character in Scribblenauts Unmasked: A DC Comics Adventure.
 Ares appears as a playable character in DC Legends.
 Ares appears as a playable character in DC Unchained.
 Ares appears as a playable character in Lego DC Super-Villains, voiced by Fred Tatasciore.

Miscellaneous
 Ares appears in DC Super Hero Girls, voiced by Fred Tatasciore.
 The Injustice incarnation of Ares appears in the Injustice: Gods Among Us prequel comics. He mocks Wonder Woman's decision to join Superman's Regime, though she counters with her knowledge that the alliance will weaken Ares. Ares attacks her, but is defeated by Superman and loses a hand to Wonder Woman. Years later, Ares secretly forms an alliance with Darkseid before striking a deal with Batman's Insurgency, promising help from the Olympians in the latter's war against Superman and freeing Billy Batson to join the ensuing fight. Following this, Ares convinces Superman to form an alliance with Poseidon, who nearly destroys Themyscira. However, Batman travels to New Genesis and convinces Highfather to intervene, leading to the latter in turn convincing Zeus to end his and the Olympians' involvement in Batman and Superman's war. Afterward, Superman takes Ares to Apokolips and leaves him to be tortured by Darkseid.
 The Injustice incarnation of Ares makes a cameo appearance in the Injustice 2 prequel comics, in which he taunts an imprisoned Wonder Woman with the future events of the game.

Merchandise
 DC Direct released an Ares action figure in 2001 as part of their Amazons and Adversaries line of Wonder Woman action figures.
 Mattel released an Ares action figure in 2008 as part of their DC Universe Classics line of toys.
 Ares received an action figure in the 2017 Wonder Woman film tie-in toy line.
 Ares received a figure in the "Wonder Woman Warrior Battle" Lego set.

See also
 Ares (Marvel Comics)
 Children of Ares (comics)

References

External links
 Bio at World's Finest
 Ares at Titans Tower.com
 Ares at Wonder Woman Yesterday, Today, & Beyond
 
 Marston, William Moulton. Emotions Of Normal People. London: Kegan Paul, Trench, Trübner & Co, Ltd. 1928. 

Action film villains
Characters created by George Pérez
Characters created by William Moulton Marston
Comics characters introduced in 1942
DC Comics characters who are shapeshifters
DC Comics characters who can move at superhuman speeds
DC Comics characters who can teleport
DC Comics characters who use magic
DC Comics characters with accelerated healing
DC Comics characters with superhuman senses
DC Comics characters with superhuman strength
DC Comics deities
DC Comics film characters
DC Comics male supervillains
DC Comics characters who have mental powers
DC Comics telekinetics 
DC Comics telepaths
Fictional characters with energy-manipulation abilities
Fictional characters with weather abilities
Fictional characters who can manipulate reality
Fictional characters who can manipulate time
Fictional characters with elemental transmutation abilities
Fictional characters with death or rebirth abilities
Fictional characters with fire or heat abilities
Fictional characters with precognition
Fictional characters who can manipulate darkness or shadows
Fictional characters who can change size
Fictional characters with immortality
Fictional characters with superhuman durability or invulnerability
Fictional characters with X-ray vision
Fictional empaths
Fictional mass murderers
Fictional necromancers
Fighting game characters
Golden Age supervillains
Classical mythology in DC Comics
Greek and Roman deities in fiction
Male film villains
Wonder Woman characters
Ares in popular culture